Mohammed Salem Al-Mal (Arabic: محمد سالم المال) (born 14 July 1985) is a Qatari footballer. He currently played former Al Arabi.

External links
 

Qatari footballers
1985 births
Living people
Al-Arabi SC (Qatar) players
Qatar Stars League players
Association football wingers 
Association football forwards